Jason Chipman is an American politician who has served in the Missouri House of Representatives from the 120th district since 2015.

References

Living people
Republican Party members of the Missouri House of Representatives
Year of birth missing (living people)
21st-century American politicians